Lorna Marlene Chávez Mata (born c. 1959) is a Costa Rican model and beauty queen who was the first representative of Costa Rica to win the Miss International pageant in 1980.

In the competition, she also won the Best in National Costume award.

References

Miss International winners
Living people
Miss International 1980 delegates
1950s births
Costa Rican beauty pageant winners